A Montanan is a resident of the state of Montana, US.

The word may also refer to:
Montanan (magazine), the University of Montana's alumni magazine
SS Montanan, a cargo ship